Trondheim Sporvei was a municipally owned tram operator in Trondheim, Norway that existed between 1936 and 1974. The company operated the municipal parts of the Trondheim Tramway until it was merged with A/S Graakalbanen and Trondheim Bilruter to create Trondheim Trafikkselskap. That company has become part of Nettbuss,  the largest Norwegian bus company in Norway which is owned by Norwegian State Railways (Norges Statsbaner AS).

History

The tramway in Trondheim was started in 1901 and replaced a horse omnibus service from 1893. The city council established Trondhjems Elektricitetsværk og Sporvei to build and operate the tramway. In 1936 the two companies were split, with Trondheim Energiverk, the other half of the company specialising as a power company.

Trondheim Sporvei operated three lines, including the original Ilalinjen and also built Elgeseterlinjen (1913), Ladelinjen (1901 and 1958) and Singsakerlinjen (1923), but not Gråkallbanen, that was run by the private A/S Graakalbanen. In 1966 though the city bought Graakalbanen and merged it with Trondheim Sporvei in 1971. In the later years Trondheim Sporvei also operated some buses, including the ones used on the closed Line 3. The company's buses were painted blue upper part, and yellow lower part. On merger with Trondheim Bilruter:Yellow upper part, dark red lower part.

References

Companies based in Trondheim
Transport companies of Trøndelag
Companies formerly owned by municipalities of Norway
Defunct railway companies of Norway
Defunct bus companies of Norway
Railway companies established in 1936
Railway companies disestablished in 1974
Transport companies established in 1936
Transport companies disestablished in 1974
Norwegian companies established in 1936
1974 disestablishments in Norway
Trondheim Tramway operators